Jack Andrew Ian Mills (born 26 March 1992) is an English footballer who plays as a defender or midfielder.

Club career 
Mills came through the Reading Academy, signing professional forms with the club in summer 2010. He was loaned out to Oxford City in August 2010 and Dutch side Telstar in January 2011 where he made seven appearances in the Eerste Divisie. He was released by Reading at the end of the 2011–12 season having not made a senior appearance for the club.

In August 2012 he trialled for Bradford City though the club opted not to sign him on a permanent basis. Later that month he signed for Conference North side Oxford City. Mills remained with Oxford until January 2013 when he moved to Staines Town though he was released at the end of the season. He made a total 39 league appearances for both sides during the 2012–13 season.

In July 2013, Mills joined Hayes & Yeading United on trial and featured in four pre-season fixtures before signing a permanent deal in August. He made his debut in a 2–0 home defeat to Bromley on 17 August and scored his first goal for the club a month later against Havant & Waterlooville.

In 2014, he signed for Wealdstone, but returned to Hayes & Yeading United later in the year.

International career 
Mills was made two appearances for the England under-19s in 2010, playing against Slovakia and Albania.

Career statistics

Notes

References

External links 
Jack Mills profile at Hayes & Yeading United F.C.

1992 births
Living people
English footballers
England youth international footballers
English expatriate footballers
Expatriate footballers in the Netherlands
Association football defenders
Association football midfielders
Reading F.C. players
Oxford City F.C. players
SC Telstar players
Staines Town F.C. players
Hayes & Yeading United F.C. players
National League (English football) players
Southern Football League players
Eerste Divisie players
Wealdstone F.C. players